A siliqua is a Roman silver coin.

Silique is a botanical term for a fruit of two fused carpels with the length being more than twice the width.

Siliqua may also refer to:

Places
 Siliqua, Sardinia, a comune in the Province of Cagliari

Biology
 Siliqua (bivalve), a genus of clam
 Ceratonia siliqua, the carob tree, a flowering evergreen shrub or tree species native to the Mediterranean region
 Ensis siliqua, the pod razor, a coastal bivalve species of European waters

Other uses
 Motorola RAZR V3, Motorola Siliqua, a model of mobile phone

See also
 Silica (disambiguation)